Pimp Master is the second studio album by pioneering jazz group Soil & "Pimp" Sessions, from Japan. It was released on June 23, 2005.

Track listing

Credits
Performed and arranged by Soil & "Pimp" Sessions
Toasting [Agitator] – Shacho
Saxophone – Motoharu
Trumpet – Tabu Zombie
Piano – Josei
Bass – Akita Goldman
Drums – Midorin
Mastered by Yasuji Maeda
Recorded and mixed by Shinjiro Ikeda
Executive Producer – Akira Sekiguchi (Victor), Katsunori Ueda (Victor)
Assistant Engineers – Yoshiyuki Watanabe (Victor Studio), Yasuhiro Shirai (Sound city), Kanako Hayashi (INNIG), Naoya Tokunou (Heart beat), Seiji Toda (Heart Beat)
A&R, Director – Yuichi Sorita (Victor)
Artist Promotion – Toyonobu Hatayama (Victor)
Sales Promotion – Yasuhiro Kanabo (Victor)
Photography – Keisuke Sanada
Artwork By [Art Direction] – Schnabel Effects
Styling – Kenji Koizumi (SCREAMING MIMI'S)
Layout – Hiroshi Yano (VDC)
Visual Direction – Tomoro Watanabe (VDC)

References

2005 albums
Soil & "Pimp" Sessions albums